The Followers of Rupert is an England-based organization formed in 1983. The organization's main course is to promote the appreciation of the past, present and future of the Daily Express character Rupert Bear and to bring enthusiasts together. 
The group takes its name from the praise on the advertisements from the Daily Express with the caption 'Follow Rupert every day'. The organization works closely with Classic Media who are owning the rights to Rupert and characters on behalf of the Express Newspapers.
The organization was founded in 1983 when the popularity of the character was once again growing in popularity. The organisation is intended primarily for adults. In the past it had a youth department, but due to declining interest it was abolished.

The organization produces a regular newsletter every season and produces a various of different related items to Rupert, including reprints of stories that aren't printed in the annuals or other books. 
The group mainly focusses on the classic Rupert stories and the continuing of the new stories who appear in the new annuals every year. It doesn't focus on the new Rupert who appeared in 2006.

Past presidents of the organization included Rupert artist Alfred Bestall and Monty Python's Terry Jones. The current president (or secretary) is John Beck. Sir Paul McCartney is a Honorary member of the Followers. Most members are based in England, but the organization does have members outside the UK as well, including from the United States, Canada, Australia and The Netherlands.

Every year in August, the Followers organise a large get-together and exchange market in Warwick along with the yearly AGM.

References

 
Comics fan clubs
Literary fan clubs
Literary societies
Organizations established in 1983